The 1963–64 Illinois Fighting Illini men's basketball team represented the University of Illinois.

Regular season
The 1963-64 Fighting Illini basketball team, playing in their first full season in Assembly Hall, dropped back from its previous championship season with a losing finish in the Big Ten and a mediocre overall record. Head coach Harry Combes guided the Illini to a 10-3 record after the first 13 games of the season only to see the team reverse trends and go 3-8 the rest of the way.  Once again the Illini played in a mid-season tournament, playing in the Los Angeles Basketball Classic. During the tournament the Illini would face eventual national champion, UCLA.

The 1963-64 team utilized several returning lettermen including the leading scorer and team "MVP" Skip Thoren. It also saw the return of team captain Bill Edwards, juniors Tal Brody, Bogie Redmon, Bill McKeown as well as sophomores Don Freeman, Jim Vopicka and Larry Hinton to their lineup. The Illini finished the season with a conference record of 6 wins and 8 losses, finishing in a 6th place tie in the Big Ten. They would finish with an overall record of 13 wins and 11 losses.  The starting lineup included Skip Thoren at the center position, Tal Brody and Jim Vopicka at guard and Don Freeman and Bogie Redmon at the forward slots.

Roster

Source

Schedule
												
Source																

|-
!colspan=12 style="background:#DF4E38; color:white;"| Non-Conference regular season
|- align="center" bgcolor=""
											

|-
!colspan=9 style="background:#DF4E38; color:#FFFFFF;"|Big Ten regular season

|-

Player stats

Awards and honors
Tal Brody
Converse Honorable Mention All-American
Sporting News Honorable Mention All-American
Duane "Skip" Thoren
Converse Honorable Mention All-American
Team Most Valuable Player

Team players drafted into the NBA

Rankings

References

Illinois Fighting Illini
Illinois Fighting Illini men's basketball seasons
1963 in sports in Illinois
1964 in sports in Illinois